Scott Bevan (born 1964 in Newcastle, New South Wales) is an Australian TV and radio presenter, journalist and biographer.

Biography
Scott Bevan grew up near Merewether in Newcastle. In 1984 he joined the Newcastle Herald as a cadet journalist. He later worked in commercial radio as a news presenter. After a fifteen-month stint in Japan he joined the Nine Network in 1989 as a reporter. He spent time in Perth working for Nine News.

Bevan moved to the Australian Broadcasting Corporation in 2005, working initially as reporter for the 7.30 Report and a presenter on ABC Local Radio. In 2008 he was posted to Moscow as a correspondent for ABC Television.

In 2010, he returned to Australia to become a presenter on ABC News 24.

In 2014, Bevan's biography of Australian artist Sir William Dobell, Bill: The Life of William Dobell, was published.

In January 2016, Bevan resigned from the ABC to restart a music career.

References

1964 births
Living people
Nine News presenters
ABC News (Australia) presenters
People from Newcastle, New South Wales
Journalists from New South Wales
University of Newcastle (Australia) alumni
ABC radio (Australia) journalists and presenters
20th-century Australian journalists
21st-century Australian journalists
Australian biographers